Events of 2022 in Tanzania.

Incumbents 
 President
 Samia Suluhu
 Vice-President: 
 Philip Mpango
 Prime Minister: Kassim Majaliwa
 Chief Justice: Ibrahim Hamis Juma

Events 
Ongoing – COVID-19 pandemic in Tanzania; 2022 Africa floods

 19 March – Twenty-two people are killed and 38 more injured during a bus–truck collision in Melela Kibaoni, Morogoro Region, Tanzania. 
 24 March – The World Health Organization announces that a polio vaccination campaign will begin in Malawi, Mozambique, Tanzania, and Zambia.
 5 October – Lawyers for Maasai herders, who say the Tanzanian government is trying to violently evict them from their ancestral land to make way for a luxury game reserve, have lodged an appeal against a court ruling that dismissed their case. 
 23 October – A fire, spread by strong winds, occurs on the slopes of Tanzania's Mount Kilimanjaro. 
 6 November – Precision Air Flight 494

Culture

Sports 
 2021–22 Tanzanian Premier League
 Tanzania at the 2022 Commonwealth Games

Deaths 
 10 February – Mwele Ntuli Malecela, 58, civil servant

See also 

2022–23 South-West Indian Ocean cyclone season
COVID-19 pandemic in Africa
Common Market for Eastern and Southern Africa
East African Community
International Conference on the Great Lakes Region

References

External links 
 

 
Tanzania
Tanzania
2020s in Tanzania
Years of the 21st century in Tanzania